Other Suns is a role-playing game published by Fantasy Games Unlimited in 1983.

Description
Other Suns is a science-fiction space-adventure system of medium complexity. The game includes a dozen alien races that resemble humanoid Earth animals such as cats, foxes, and bears. The rules cover character creation, combat, skills, psionics, careers, experience, and starships and other technology. The section on world-building goes into great detail on some physical aspects of planets. The games includes a GM's screen.

Publication history
Other Suns was designed by Niall C. Shapero, and was published in 1983 by Fantasy Games Unlimited as a boxed set with a 72-page book, a 64-page book, a cardstock screen, and a sample character sheet.

An additional article entitled "Luna, The Empire and the Stars" by Shapero which expanded upon the background contained in the boxed set appeared in the September 1984 issue of the gaming magazine Dragon.

Reception
Lawrence Schick calls the game "The original 'Pets in Space' game", and notes that the rules are similar to RuneQuest.

Reviews
Different Worlds #39 (May/June, 1985)

References
Notes

Sources

External links
 
 Interview with Niall Shapero

Fantasy Games Unlimited games
Role-playing games introduced in 1983
Space opera role-playing games